Pavel Vladimirovich Dolgov (born 16 August 1996) is a Russian football player who plays as an attacking midfielder for Chayka Peschanokopskoye.

Club career
Pavel started playing football in Baltika Kaliningrad youth team. In 2011, he joined the Zenit Saint Petersburg football academy.

He made his professional debut in the Russian Professional Football League for FC Zenit-2 St. Petersburg on 18 August 2013 in a game against FC Volga Tver.

He made his Russian Premier League debut for FC Zenit St. Petersburg on 1 August 2015 in a game against FC Terek Grozny.

On 1 July 2022, Atyrau announced the signing of Dolgov.

Career statistics

Club

References

External links

1996 births
Living people
Sportspeople from Kaliningrad Oblast
Russian footballers
Association football forwards
FC Zenit Saint Petersburg players
FC Anzhi Makhachkala players
FC Torpedo-BelAZ Zhodino players
FC Yenisey Krasnoyarsk players
FC Tom Tomsk players
FC Amkar Perm players
FC Zenit-2 Saint Petersburg players
FC Metallurg Lipetsk players
FC Atyrau players
Russian Premier League players
Russian First League players
Russian Second League players
Belarusian Premier League players
Kazakhstan Premier League players
Russian expatriate footballers
Expatriate footballers in Belarus
Russian expatriate sportspeople in Belarus
Expatriate footballers in Kazakhstan
Russian expatriate sportspeople in Kazakhstan